Traces of Smoke or  Rooksporen  is a 1992 Dutch drama film directed by Frans van de Staak.

Cast
Marlies Heuer	... 	De vrouw
Peter Blok	... 	De vragensteller
Joop Admiraal		
Rein Bloem		
Sacha Bulthuis		
Carine Crutzen		
Hildegard Draayer		
René Eljon		
Andrea den Haring		
Hans Hausdörfer		
Thom Hoffman		
Ineke Holzhaus		
Ingrid Kuipers		
Willem Kwakkelstein		
Johan Leysen		
Colla Marsman		
Tessa du Mee	
Wim Meuwissen		
Titus Muizelaar		
Frieda Pittoors		
Lineke Rijxman		
Hanneke Stark		
Catherine ten Bruggencate		
Huub van der Lubbe		
Manouk van der Meulen		
Anke Van't Hof	
Hilt de Vos		
Nico de Vries

External links 
 

Dutch drama films
1992 films
1990s Dutch-language films